Avdeyevo is the name of several rural localities in Russia:
Avdeyevo, Moscow Oblast, a village in Zaraysky District of Moscow Oblast
Avdeyevo, Novgorod Oblast, a village in Pestovsky District of Novgorod Oblast
Avdeyevo, Republic of Karelia, a village in Pudozhsky District of Republic of Karelia
Avdeyevo, Ust-Kubinsky District, Vologda Oblast, a village in Ust-Kubinsky District, Vologda Oblast
Avdeyevo, Vologodsky District, Vologda Oblast, a village in Vologodsky District of Vologda Oblast
Avdeyevo, Yaroslavl Oblast, a village in Rybinsky District of Yaroslavl Oblast